Adeona is the Roman Goddess of safe return. Like Abeona, She is sometimes considered an aspect of Juno as They both protect children; as Juno is the Roman Goddess of mothers She is of course especially concerned with the young. Together Adeona and Abeona teach the young child to walk and watch over her or his first steps; this theme of protecting the first steps of a child also extends to their protection of grown children who move away from home for the first time. Adeona name comes from the Latin verb adeo, "to approach or visit" as well as "to take possession of one's inheritance"; perhaps the connection between these two meanings lies in the idea of "to come home again". Adeona is believed to watch over children as they go to and from school, and to especially preside over bringing them home safely.

She is also said to protect all travellers.

Alternate spelling: Adiona

References 

Roman goddesses
Childhood goddesses